Banua Wuhu is a submarine volcano that rises more than  from the sea floor in the Sangihe Islands of Indonesia. Historical records show that several ephemeral islands were formed and disappeared. Another new island was formed in 1919 but then disappeared by 1935.

See also 

 List of volcanoes in Indonesia

References 

Active volcanoes of Indonesia
Submarine volcanoes of Indonesia
New islands
Ephemeral islands
Former islands from the last glacial maximum
Seamounts of the Celebes Sea